Richard (von) Schaukal (27 May 1874 in Brno – 10 October 1942 in Vienna) was a Moravia-born Austrian poet.

Bibliography
Gedichte, 1893 (poetry)
Meine Gärten, 1897 (poetry)
Tristia, 1898 (poetry)
Tage und Träume, 1899 (poetry)
Sehnsucht, 1900 (poetry)
Intérieurs aus dem Leben der Zwanzigjährigen, 1901
Von Tod zu Tod und andere kleine Geschichten, 1902
Pierrot und Colombine oder das Lied von der Ehe, 1902
Mimi Lynx, 1904 (novella)
Eros Thanatos, 1906 (short stories)
Leben und Meinungen des Herrn Andreas von Balthesser eines Dandy und Dilettanten, 1907
Giorgone oder Gespräche über die Kunst, 1907
Buch der Seele, 1908 (poetry)
Vom unsichtbaren Königreich, 1910
Die Märchen von Hans Bürgers Kindheit, 1913
Kindergedichte, 1913
Eherne Sonette. 1914, 1914
Herbst, 1914 (poetry)
Das Buch Immergrün, 1915 
Heimat der Seele, 1916 (poetry)
Dionys-bácsi, 1922 (short stories)	
Jahresringe, 1922 (poetry)
Herbsthöhe, 1933 (poetry)

External links

Aeiou (an entry on R.S. in an Austrian database for cultural information / German language/ with one photograph shown and secondary literature)

1874 births
1942 deaths
Writers from Brno
People from the Margraviate of Moravia
Austrian people of Moravian-German descent
Austrian untitled nobility
19th-century Austrian poets
Austrian male poets
20th-century Austrian poets
19th-century male writers
20th-century male writers
Austro-Hungarian poets